Francesco Maria Neri (6 February 1628 – December 1684) was a Roman Catholic prelate who served as Bishop of Venosa (1678–1684) and Bishop of Massa Lubrense (1672–1678).

Biography
Francesco Maria Neri was born in Tivoli, Italy on 6 February 1628 and ordained a priest on 31 December 1654. He held the degree of Doctor in utroque iure, and was the fiscal advocate of the Holy Office (Inquisition) in the Kingdom of Naples (1667). He was a canon of the cathedral of Naples, and in 1668 became its penitentiary major.

On 16 May 1672, he was appointed Bishop of Massa Lubrense by Pope Clement X. On 22 May 1672, he was consecrated bishop by Federico Borromeo (iuniore), Cardinal-Priest of Sant'Agostino, with Bernardino Rocci, Titular Archbishop of Damascus, and Domenico Gianuzzi, Titular Bishop of Dioclea in Phrygia,  serving as co-consecrators.

On 10 January 1678, he was appointed by Pope Innocent XI as Bishop of Venosa.
He served as Bishop of Venosa until his death in December 1684.

References

External links and additional sources
Giordani, D. V. (1862), "Venosa," , in: Pietro Pianton (ed.), Enciclopedia ecclesiastica Vol. VII (Venezia: Girolamo Tasso, 1862) p. 953.

17th-century Italian Roman Catholic bishops
Bishops appointed by Pope Clement X
Bishops appointed by Pope Innocent XI
1628 births
1684 deaths